Thundering Spring is a spring in the U.S. state of Georgia.

Thundering Spring was so named for the peculiar noises the spring produces.

References

Rivers of Georgia (U.S. state)
Rivers of Upson County, Georgia